Günther C. Feigl  (born 1968 in Graz, Austria) is an Austrian neurosurgeon. Feigl is an internationally renowned expert in minimally invasive neurosurgery. His main areas of expertise are skull base surgery and neurooncology. He specializes in the surgery of gliomas, minimally invasive endoscopy-assisted microvascular decompression in trigeminal neuralgia (facial pain) and facial hemispasm (involuntary facial twitching) as well as the surgery of acoustic neuromas (tumors of the vestibular nerves), tumors of the pineal gland and meningiomas of the skull base. Furthermore, his specialties comprise treatment of pituitary adenomas, spinal cord tumours and metastases as well as the area of pediatric neurosurgery.

Education 

Günther C. Feigl began his medical education in the USA. After studying in Dallas, Houston and Graz and several years of brain tumor research at the Neuroscience Institute at Baylor College of Medicine in the Texas Medical Center in Houston, the largest medical center in the world, he was working on his thesis on radiosurgery in the treatment of pituitary tumors using the gamma-knife method. He did his neurosurgical training in Germany, where he trained at INI (International Neuroscience Institute) in Hannover with the worldwide renowned neurosurgeon and pioneer in the field of neurosurgery Madjid Samii. In Tübingen he trained with Marcos Tatagiba where he completed his residency in neurosurgery. Feigl got a Ph.D. from the Eberhard Karls University in Tübingen.

Career 

Günther C. Feigl habilitated at the Eberhard Karl University in Tübingen and has equally acquired an associate professorship for neurosurgery. As Head of Skull Base Surgery at Katharinenhospital in Stuttgart, he specialized in minimally invasive neurosurgery and neuroendoscopy.

Today, he is the chairman of the department of neurosurgery at Klinikum Bamberg().
Besides his position as chairman, Feigl is the Director of the Brain Tumor Center Bamberg as well as the Director of the Skull Base Center Bamberg, which he both founded. He is also the Medical Director of Neuronetz Bamberg practice center. Due to his internationally recognized expertise in minimally invasive skull base surgery and neurooncology, Günther C. Feigl became an affiliate faculty member at the Houston Methodist Research Institute (HMRI) Neurosciences Research Program in March 2018 and Adjunct Professor of Neurosurgery at the Houston Methodist Hospital (IAM) in December 2019.

Feigl is a member of the medical advisory board of the Acoustic Schwannoma Patient Support Group, the German Skull Base Society and the German Neurological Society. He is a founding member of the European Low Grad Glioma Network

Publications
His most-cited peer reviewed publications are:

 
 
 

Most recent publications:

References 

Austrian neurosurgeons
Living people
1968 births
Baylor College of Medicine alumni
Academic staff of the University of Tübingen
Austrian expatriates in the United States
Austrian expatriates in Germany
20th-century surgeons
21st-century surgeons
20th-century Austrian physicians
21st-century Austrian physicians
Physicians from Graz